Dęblin railway station is a railway station serving Dęblin in Lublin Voivodeship, Poland. It is served by Koleje Mazowieckie (who run services from Dęblin to Warszawa Zachodnia and Radom), Przewozy Regionalne and PKP Intercity (TLK services).

During the Holocaust thousands of Jews were deported from Dęblin–Irena Ghetto to the extermination camps via this station.

Train services
The station is served by the following service(s):

 Intercity services (IC) Łódź Fabryczna — Warszawa — Lublin Główny
Intercity services (TLK) Kołobrzeg — Gdynia Główna — Warszawa Wschodnia — Kraków Główny''

References

Station article at kolej.one.pl

External links 
 

Railway stations in Lublin Voivodeship
Railway stations served by Koleje Mazowieckie
Ryki County
Railway stations served by Przewozy Regionalne InterRegio